Will Blake (born 1991) is an American painter best known for his representations of American Civil War reenactment. He studied at the Florence Academy of Art in the summer of 2012, the Glasgow School of Art in the spring of 2013 and graduated from the University of Illinois Urbana-Champaign BFA painting program in 2014. His exhibition with artist Sean Tierney at Figure One, titled "Between the States" was his first showing of his Civil War reenactment work.

References

External links
Will Blake official website

21st-century American painters
21st-century American male artists
1991 births
Living people
American male painters